St. Wilfrid's Church, Kelham is a parish church in the Church of England in Kelham, Nottinghamshire.

The church is Grade I listed by the Department for Digital, Culture, Media and Sport as a building of outstanding architectural or historic interest.

History

The church is medieval and was restored in 1874 by the Durham-based architect Charles Hodgson Fowler.

Parish structure

The Church of St. Wilfrid, Kelham is part of a joint parish which includes the churches of
Church of St. Michael and All Angels, Averham
St. Wilfrid's Church, North Muskham
St. Wilfrid's Church, South Muskham

Memorials

There is a memorial on the south side of the chancel to Robert Sutton, 2nd Baron Lexinton who died in 1723 and his wife Margaret who died in 1703.

Sources
The Buildings of England, Nottinghamshire. Nikolaus Pevsner

Church of England church buildings in Nottinghamshire
Grade I listed churches in Nottinghamshire